Jerome Harmon (born February 6, 1969, in Gary, Indiana) is a retired professional basketball shooting guard who spent one season in the National Basketball Association (NBA) as a member of the Philadelphia 76ers. He attended the University of Louisville. He sat out three of his four college seasons due to academic and injury reasons. He went undrafted in the 1991 NBA draft but played for the Seattle SuperSonics in the Los Angeles Summer Pro League. He later signed with the Washington Bullets but was waived before the start of the exhibition season. He started his professional career with the Louisville Shooters in Global Basketball Association In February 1995, he signed a 10-day contract with the Philadelphia 76ers. In his first three games, he averaged 10.7 points and 4.0 rebounds per game. He was rewarded with another 10-day contract but was released from the club at its conclusion.

References

External links

Statistics at Statscrew.com

1969 births
Living people
American expatriate basketball people in France
American expatriate basketball people in Italy
American expatriate basketball people in the Philippines
American expatriate basketball people in Switzerland
American men's basketball players
Basketball players from Gary, Indiana
Cholet Basket players
Columbus Horizon players
Élan Chalon players
Fort Wayne Fury players
Grand Rapids Hoops players
Louisville Cardinals men's basketball players
Philadelphia 76ers players
Philippine Basketball Association imports
Rochester Renegade players
Shooting guards
Undrafted National Basketball Association players
Great Taste Coffee Makers players